Robert L. Farmer (July 23, 1933 – November 17, 2020) was an American judge and politician. He served as a Democratic member of the North Carolina House of Representatives.

Life and career 
Farmer was born in Johnston County, North Carolina. He attended Smithfield High School, the University of North Carolina and the University of North Carolina School of Law. He served in the United States Army.

In 1971, Farmer was elected to the North Carolina House of Representatives. In 1977, he was appointed by Governor Jim Hunt to serve as a judge for the Resident Superior Court, serving until 1999.

Farmer died in November 2020, at the age of 87.

References 

1933 births
2020 deaths
People from Johnston County, North Carolina
Democratic Party members of the North Carolina House of Representatives
20th-century American politicians
North Carolina state court judges
20th-century American judges
University of North Carolina alumni
University of North Carolina School of Law alumni